Azizollah Khoshvaqt, also known as Ayatollah Khoshvaqt (1926 – 19 February 2013), was a contemporary philosopher, mystic, theologian and faqih. He was a student of Muhammad Husayn Tabatabai, Seyyed Hossein Borujerdi and Seyyed Ruhollah Khomeini. He was the second child of the family, went to seminary after passing high-school, and went to Qom after educating for five years in Lorzadeh mosque in Tehran.

Azizollah Khoshvaght came back to Tehran after the end of his seminary education, and got married at the age of 33, and the result of this marriage was 2 sons and 4 daughters for him. His parents were from Zanjan. Khoshvaqt is considered to be a prominent scholar, Faqih and a teacher of ethics. Azizollah Khoshvaght who was also well known as Aziz Khoshvaght, was also the Imam Jama'a of Imam Hassan-Mojtaba mosque in Tehran.

Azizollah Khoshvaght died at the age of 86, when he was in Mecca on 19 February 2013.

See also
 Seyyed Mostafa Khamenei, Azizollah Khoshvaght's son-in-law

References

1926 births
2013 deaths
Iranian ayatollahs
People from Zanjan Province
People from Tehran
Iranian grand ayatollahs